Doe v. Chiquita Brands International is a class-action lawsuit brought in the United States District Court of New Jersey, filed on June 13, 2007. The suit was filed by Colombian families represented by EarthRights International (ERI), together with the Colombian Institute of International Law (CIIL), and Judith Brown Chomsky, against the Cincinnati-based producer and distributor of Chiquita Brands International. The suit alleges that Chiquita funded and armed known terrorist organizations (as designated by the United States Secretary of State) in Colombia.

The 144 plaintiffs allege that terrorists funded by Chiquita Brands killed 173 individuals of whom the plaintiffs were legal representatives. The killings took place over a lengthy period of time from 1975 to 2004 and most occurred in the 1990s and 2000s.

Chiquita Brands has admitted in federal court that a subsidiary company (which was subsequently sold) paid Colombian terrorists to protect employees at its most profitable banana-growing operation. As part of a deal with prosecutors, the company pleaded guilty to one count of doing business with a terrorist organization. In exchange, the company will pay a $25-million fine and court documents will not reveal the identities of the group of senior executives who approved the illegal protection payments.

See also
United Fruit Company

References

 "The Chiquita Papers: Banana Giant's Paramilitary Payoffs Detailed in Trove of Declassified Legal, Financial Documents", National Security Archive Electronic Briefing Book No. 340
 "Documents Implicate Colombian Government in Chiquita Terror Scandal", National Security Archive Electronic Briefing Book No. 217

External links
Complaint
 CNN Defends Chiquita on a Very Slippery Slope,  Columbia Journalism Review
 Revista Semana: interview -  “La justificación de Chiquita no es aceptable”
 International Rights Advocates - Doe v. Chiquita  Jane/John Does 1 - 144 v. Chiquita Brands International, Inc, and David Does 1-10

United States District Court for the District of New Jersey cases
Colombian conflict
2007 in Colombia
Class action lawsuits
Banana production